The year 2003 in birding and ornithology.

See also 2002 in birding and ornithology, main events of 2003, other specialist lists of events in 2003 and 2004 in birding and ornithology.

Worldwide

New species

See also Bird species new to science described in the 2000s

 The Munchique wood-wren from the Colombian Andes is described as new to science in the online journal Ornitologica Colombiana
 The Okarito brown kiwi from South Island, New Zealand is described as new to science in the Records of the Auckland Museum

To be completed

Taxonomic developments
To be completed

Ornithologists

Deaths
 12 January - Dean Amadon
 16 January - Chris Mead
 13 February - Stuart Keith
 24 April - Guy Mountfort
 26 April - Edward Max Nicholson
 27 April - Mick Rogers
 7 August - Roxie Collie Laybourne
 15 September - Richard Liversidge
 10 October - Frank Pitelka
 ? - Sakae Tamura
 ? - Stephen Marchant
 ? - Colin Harrison

Europe

Britain

Breeding birds
To be completed

Migrant and wintering birds
 130 chiffchaff overwintered at St Austell, 50 at Helston and 25 at Countess Weir. All the sites were "old fashoned" sewage works where the micro climate and lush vegetation ensure plenty of insects through the winter

Rare birds
 Taiga flycatcher was added to the British list, with a male at Flamborough Head, east Yorkshire in April, followed by a first-winter in Shetland in September.
 Britain's first Audouin's gull was found in May at Dungeness, Kent
 A male black lark at South Stack, Anglesey in June was initially thought to be Britain's first, and was seen by thousands of birders; it subsequently transpired that an earlier record, also a male, from Spurn, east Yorkshire in 1984 had just recently been accepted by the British Birds Rarities Committee, so making the South Stack bird Britain's second
 A female redhead on Barra, Outer Hebrides from September through until April 2004 was Britain's third (but the first female).
 Britain's third American coot occurred in Shetland in November and stayed into 2004.
 Britain's third lesser sand plover, a breeding-plumaged male of the race mongolus occurred at Keyhaven Marshes, Hampshire in July.
 Britain's fourth (and first spring) thick-billed warbler occurred on Fair Isle in May; the same island hosted Britain's fourth Siberian rubythroat and third Savannah sparrow simultaneously during October.
 A record influx of Hume's leaf warblers occurred in late autumn, consisting of over 20 birds.
 The first ever influx of Arctic redpolls of the Greenland race hornemanni occurred during the autumn.

Other events
 The British Birdwatching Fair has Madagascar's wetlands as its theme for the year.

Scandinavia
To be completed

North America
 An unprecedented movement of American robins in eastern North America on 8–9 November. Over 500,000 were recorded passing over Cape May after a deep low pressure system swept migrants into the north east of the United States

References

Birding and ornithology
Bird
Birding and ornithology by year